Bothriochloa laguroides, the silver blue stem, is a species of grass in the genus Bothriochloa of the family Poaceae. The species is native to Mexico and South America.

References  

laguroides